Steven A. M. Prentice is a published author and a professional speaker, whose area of expertise is the relationship between technology, people and work. He founded the consulting firm The Bristall Group (formerly Bristall Morgan Inc.). in 1994, and is a frequent guest on radio and television in Canada and the United States. He also served as a consulting producer on the series CEO-TV. He is a regular lecturer at the University of Ontario Institute of Technology.

Education 
Prentice graduated from Concordia University in Montreal in 1989 with a B.A. in Communications Studies. He attended law school at the Osgoode Hall Law School at York University from 1990-1992 but did not complete his degree, instead founding Bristall Morgan Inc. Ten years later he returned to York University to study Psychology. He graduated in 2007 with a B.A. in Psychology.

Writings 
Prentice has written three books. Cool Time: A Hands-on Plan for Managing Work and Balancing Time was published in 2005 by John Wiley and Sons Ltd. It approached Time Management from a joint platform of psychology and project management and proposed solutions based on influence, rather than prioritization. His second book, Cool Down: Getting Further by Going Slower, was again published by John Wiley and Sons Ltd. and challenged the high-speed nature of life today. It did not advocate working slower, but instead offered some of the ideas brought forth by the Slow Movement in Japan that mental thought and clarity would be of better use to North American working people than would constant distraction. His third book, entitled "Work Like a Wolf: Own Your Future," was self-published in 2012. It describes techniques for career survival and life management by keeping one's "hunting instincts" (such as networking and lifelong learning) sharp. In 2013 he published his first novel, entitled "Mouth."

References

External links
 The Bristall Group
 Steve Prentice.com

Living people
Year of birth missing (living people)